Warming Up to the Ice Age was singer-songwriter John Hiatt's seventh album, released in 1985.  It was his last album with Geffen Records, who dropped Hiatt after the album failed to chart.  It was the last Hiatt studio album to miss the Billboard 200.  "The Usual" would later be covered by Bob Dylan.  "Living a Little, Laughing a Little", originally a hit for The Spinners, was a duet with Elvis Costello.

During the recording of the album Hiatt was still doing drugs and drinking which, he felt, diminished the quality of the album and also meant he was short on material. "The wholeness got dissipated by my personal problems, and I think that kind of showed up on 'Warming Up to the Ice Age'. I was drinking and drugging a lot and eventually I was consumed by it. After 'Ice Age' I got sober." Influencing Hiatt's decision to become sober was the birth of his daughter Lilly in 1984. Shortly after giving birth to Lilly, Hiatt's estranged wife committed suicide, leaving him a single father. Hiatt remained sober throughout the "Warming Up to the Ice Age" tour, which he called a "scary experience".

The album failed to build on the critical momentum of its predecessor, Riding with the King, and Hiatt found himself without a label as Geffen dropped him from their roster.

Track listing
All tracks written by John Hiatt, except where noted

"The Usual" – 3:46
"The Crush" – 4:11
"When We Ran" – 4:44
"She Said The Same Things to Me" – 4:01
"Living a Little, Laughing a Little" (Thom Bell, Linda Creed) – 4:03 
"Zero House" – 3:41
"Warming Up to the Ice Age" – 3:42
"I'm a Real Man" – 2:32
"Number One Honest Game" – 4:26
"I Got a Gun" – 3:48

Personnel
John Hiatt – guitar, vocals
Jesse Boyce – bass guitar, rhythm guitar on "The Usual" and "The Crush"
Larrie Londin – drums
Randy McCormick – keyboards
with:
Willie Green, Jr. – bass vocals on "The Crush" and "She Said The Same Things to Me"
Bobby King – additional vocals on "The Crush"
Elvis Costello – additional vocals on "Living a Little, Laughing a Little"
Jon Goin – guitar on "Living a Little, Laughing a Little", "Zero House" and "Warming Up to the Ice Age"
Mac Gayden – rhythm guitar on "She Said The Same Things to Me"
Frieda Woody – vocals on "Living a Little, Laughing a Little" and "She Said The Same Things to Me"
Jerry Hey – trumpet on "The Usual" and "The Crush"
Gary Grant – trumpet on "The Usual" and "The Crush"
Chuck Findley – trombone on "The Usual" and "The Crush"
Bill Reichenbach Jr. – trombone on "The Usual" and "The Crush"
Larry Williams – saxophone on "The Usual" and "The Crush"
Kim Hutchcroft – saxophone on "The Usual" and "The Crush"
Anita Baugh, Dianne Davidson, Tracy Nelson – backing vocals on "Living a Little, Laughing a Little" and "Number One Honest Game"

References

1985 albums
John Hiatt albums
Albums produced by Norbert Putnam
Geffen Records albums